Daaash may refer to:بنبنص

Dadash (given name)
Dadash Kandi, a village in Iran
Sari Kand-e Dadash Beyk, a village in Iran